The Young People's Teen Musical Theatre Company is a performing arts company located in San Francisco, California.  Its mission is to provide exposure to and training in musical theatre and other forms of live performance.  Founded in 1984, the group is sponsored by the San Francisco Recreation & Parks Department and supported by a 501(c)(3) non-profit, Friends of the Company.

History 
As funding for arts in the public schools was being cut in the early '80s, Diane Price, who taught tap dance at neighborhood playgrounds for the Recreation and Parks Department, realized that children in the city needed an affordable and accessible opportunity to explore the world of musical theatre and the performing arts.  She convinced her superiors to let her start the a theatre company for teens.

The Company, now in its 34th year, continues to offer teenagers professional quality training in drama, dance, and voice.  The group puts on three to four shows per year.

As part of the 30th anniversary celebration, a photo exhibit featuring images of company members and productions through the years was compiled and put on display at the Recreation and Parks department headquarters at McLaren Lodge in Golden Gate Park.  In addition, an alumni show featuring former company members who have gone on to have successful careers in the performing arts is planned for December 2015.

Notable alumni
Several members of YPTMTC have won or been finalists in the annual Beach Blanket Babylon Scholarship Competition including Cecilia Foecke (2002, Voice), Philip Ngo (2003, Acting), and Angela Travins (2007, Voice).  Many have gone on to have successful careers on Broadway and in Hollywood.

Alumni include 2014 Tony Award Winner Lena Hall (Hedwig and the Angry Inch, Cats), Amir Talai (Harold & Kumar Escape from Guantanamo Bay, What to Expect When You're Expecting), Jaime Rosenstein (Wicked), Anderson Lim (Awesome 80s Prom), Dominic Nolfi (Jersey Boys, Motown: The Musical), Rodney Jackson Jr. (Book of Mormon, Motown), Justin Mendoza (Book of Mormon, Wicked, In The  Heights), Vincent Rodriguez III (Crazy Ex-Girlfriend), Melissa Hutchison (The Walking Dead).

Directors 
The founder and original director of YPTMTC was Diane Price.  Mrs. Price (née Berman) was herself an actress who performed at The Purple Onion, the Opera Ring, Bimbo's 365 Club, The Hungry i, and the Sea Witch, all in San Francisco. She was director of the group from 1984 to her retirement in 2009.

Anne Marie Ullman (née Bookwalter), an alumnus of the YPTMTC, was the director from 2005 through 2007.  Anne Marie is currently the theatre director and drama teacher at San Francisco's Jewish Community High School.

Nicola Bosco-Alvarez took over as Director & Choreographer in 2007 after 12 years as an Artist in-Residence and Choreographer with the San Francisco Arts Education Project.  Nicola has an Associate Credential of the Cecchetti ISTD (Imperial Society of Teachers of Dancing) and has studied professionally in Florence, Italy.

Performance history
YPTMTC has produced more than 120 shows ranging from classics like West Side Story, A Chorus Line, and South Pacific to more controversial works such as Rent, Spring Awakening, and the Rocky Horror Picture Show, as well as multiple original revues.

In the summer of 2019, the Company joined with three other performing arts organizations, the SF Bay Area Theatre  Company (SFBATCO), the San Francisco Arts Education Project Players (SFArtsEd), and the UC Berkeley Summer Symphony in a production of West Side Story.  In February 2020, the Company produced the musical The Little Mermaid as a zero-waste, eco-friendly production in which nothing was purchased and little to no waste was produced.  The sets and costumes were made from recycled materials.

In addition, the Company has performed regularly at Halloween events such as Rec and Parks' Scaregrove and as part of the Fear Oaks Haunt.  The Company also regularly performs at the tree lighting ceremony in front of the Recreation and Parks Department's headquarters at McLaren Lodge in Golden Gate Park.

Production listing

 1984: Bit's & Pieces, A Revue
 1985: Bits & Pieces II, A Revue
 1985: Once Upon A Mattress
 1986: Bits & Pieces III, A Revue
 1986: Guys and Dolls
 1986: Summer Stock '86, A Revue
 1987: How To Succeed In Business Without Really Trying
 1987: The Fantasticks
 1987: West Side Story
 1988: Bits & Pieces 80's Style, A Revue
 1988: Damn Yankees
 1988: Joseph and the Amazing Technicolor Dreamcoat
 1988: Snoopy!
 1989: Archy and Mehitable
 1989: Bits & Pieces, The Rock Musicals
 1989: Hooray for Hollywood
 1989: Little Shop of Horrors
 1989: The Pajama Game
 1990: Bits & Pieces, A Look To The 90's
 1990: Showstoppers (7th Anniv. Reunion Revue)
 1990: Smile
 1990: Stop The World I Want To Get Off (First Alumni Show)
 1990: The Boy Friend
 1991: Horrorific Broadway
 1991: Into The Woods
 1991: Shakespeare, Soliloquys, Songs & Such
 1991: Sugar
 1992: 42nd Street
 1992: Comic Strip Broadway
 1992: South Pacific
 1992: Tribute (to Andrew Lloyd Webber)
 1993: A Chorus Line
 1993: Carousel
 1993: Gypsy
 1993: Onstage, A Kander & Ebb Revue
 1993: Tribute II (to Stephen Sondheim)
 1993: West Side Story
 1994: Assassins
 1994: It's A Bird, It's A Plane, It's Superman
 1994: Jesus Christ Superstar
 1994: Once Upon A Mattress
 1994: Showstoppers (10th Anniv. Gala)
 1994: To Be A Performer
 1995: British Invasions, a Musical Review
 1995: Rainbow, a Musical Review
 1995: Two Gentlemen of Verona
 1996: Bye Bye Birdie
 1996: Hot & Cole, a Musical Review
 1996: The American Clock
 1997: Blood Brothers
 1997: By George!
 1997: More or Loesser
 1997: On the Town
 1998: Black on Broadway
 1998: Kiss Me, Kate
 1998: Plain and Fancy
 1998: Ya Gotta Have Hart
 1999: City of Angels
 1999: Smile
 1999: The 90's on Broadway
 1999: Yip, Yip Hooray!
 2000: 2000 On Broadway
 2000: A Tribute To Charles Schulz
 2000: Company
 2000: Fiddler on the Roof
 2000: Into the Woods
 2000: Tell Me on a Sunday
 2001: A Chorus Line
 2001: Bells Are Ringing
 2001: Side Show
 2001: The Shakespeare Revue
 2002: Dames at Sea
 2002: Fame
 2002: Sweeney Todd
 2002: Teens on Broadway
 2003: "Big" The Musical
 2003: Damn Yankees
 2003: On Broadway, the Rock Musicals
 2003: On the Town
 2003: Rags (musical)
 2003: Showstoppers 20 (20th Anniversary Reunion Gala)
 2004: Strictly Sondheim
 2004: Wiz-O-Mania
 2004: The Musical Theater Project
 2005: A Funny Thing Happened on the Way to the Forum
 2005: British Invasions
 2005: Ragtime
 2005: The Pajama Game
 2006: Cole
 2006: Seussical
 2006: The Most Happy Fella
 2006: Ya Gotta Have Hart
 2007: Blood Brothers
 2007: By George
 2007: Gypsy
 2007: History of Musical Theatre
 2007: Into The Woods
 2008: Bat Boy
 2008: Broadway Rocks
 2008: Pippin
 2008: The Shakespeare Revue
 2009: And the World Goes ‘Round
 2009: Grease
 2009: HAIR
 2010: The 25th Annual Putnam County Spelling Bee
 2010: Once Upon A Broadway
 2010: Once Upon A Mattress
 2010: RENT – The School Edition
 2011: Assassins
 2011: Into the Woods
 2011: Saturday Night
 2012: Cabaret
 2012: Godspell
 2012: Spring Awakening
 2013: Disco Inferno
 2013: Little Shop of Horrors
 2014: Cats
 2014: The Apple Tree
 2014: The Rocky Horror Show
 2015: Fiddler on the Roof
 2015: The Fantasticks
 2015: Thoroughly Modern Millie
 2016: American Idiot
 2016: Big Fish
 2016: Not Your Mama’s Shakespeare, An Original Revue
 2017: The Addams Family
 2017: Bloody Bloody Andrew Jackson
 2018: Bat Boy
 2018: Snoopy!
 2019: Carrie
 2019: Sister Act
 2019: West Side Story
 2020: The Little Mermaid

Friends of the Company
The Friends of the Company is a non-profit organization dedicated to supporting the company, both financially and operationally.  It was founded in 2003 to ensure the continuation of the company should the founding director, Diane Price retire.

Related organizations
 SF ArtsEd Players
 SFBATCO

References

External links
 Young People's Teen Musical Theatre Company

Musical theatre companies
Youth theatre companies
Theatre companies in San Francisco
Non-profit organizations based in San Francisco
Youth organizations based in California